Micești may refer to several places in Romania:

Micești, a commune in Argeș County
Micești, a village in Alba Iulia municipality, Alba County
Micești, a village in Tureni Commune, Cluj County
Casele Micești, a village in Feleacu Commune, Cluj County
Micești (river), a tributary of the Râul Doamnei in Argeș County

See also 
 Mica (disambiguation)
 Miculești (disambiguation)